Kyzyl-Jar (also Kyzyl-Dzhar, pronounced , literally "Red cliff") is a village in Aksy District of Jalal-Abad Region in Kyrgyzstan. Its population was 7,074 in 2021. The river Naryn separates the village from Uch-Kurgan, Uzbekistan, not far from Namangan. The area and even the village are still sometimes referred to as Uch-Korgon, presumably due to the lumping together of the two villages during Soviet times. Until 2004, the rural community Nazaraliev, of which Kyzyl-Jar is part, was named Uchkorgon. The village is located on the edge of the Fergana Valley and as such is a heavy watermelon, melon, and cotton-producing area.

Population

References
  

Populated places in Jalal-Abad Region